Greg Clark (born March 5, 1965) is a former linebacker who played in the National Football League.

Biography
Clark was born Gregory Klondike Clark on March 5, 1965, in Los Angeles.

He played prep football for North Torrance High, where in his senior year his team made it to the CIF final game. He played for Arizona State 1984-1987.

Career
Clark was drafted in the twelfth round of the 1988 NFL Draft by the Chicago Bears and spent his first season with the team. The next two seasons he spent with the Miami Dolphins and the Los Angeles Rams. He split the 1991 NFL season between the San Diego Chargers and the Green Bay Packers before spending his final season with the Seattle Seahawks.

He played at the collegiate level at Arizona State University.

See also
List of Miami Dolphins players
List of Green Bay Packers players

References

Players of American football from Los Angeles
Chicago Bears players
Miami Dolphins players
Los Angeles Rams players
San Diego Chargers players
Green Bay Packers players
Seattle Seahawks players
American football linebackers
Arizona State Sun Devils football players
Living people
1965 births